Tito Agujari (25 April 1834 – 2 November 1908) was a well-known Italian portraitist and history painter. He first began learning to paint at the Academy of Fine Arts, and then began travelling to Trieste to learn more. He also travelled to England and France later in his life to learn.

References 

1834 births
1908 deaths
Italian portrait painters
History painters
People from Adria
Artists from Trieste
19th-century Italian painters
Italian male painters
20th-century Italian painters
19th-century Italian male artists
20th-century Italian male artists